Kenny Yuko (born August 1, 1950) is an American politician and union activist who served as a member of the Ohio Senate, representing the 25th District. Previously, he was a member of the Ohio House of Representatives, representing the 7th District from 2005 to 2012. Yuko was a political and union activist for more than two decades.

Early life and education
Yuko grew up in Euclid, Ohio and graduated from Brush High School. He attended Cuyahoga Community College and Kent State University.

Career

Yuko began his career as a buyer for Polsky's Department Store, and went on to the Laborers’ Local #860 for 30 years, including 25 years as union organizer. He retired from that service in 2004.

Yuko first ran for the Ohio House of Representatives in 2004 to replace four-term incumbent Ed Jerse, who was unable to seek re-election due to term limits. In the 2004 primary, he defeated Kent Smith. He won reelection in 2006, 2008, and 2010. Yuko served as Chairman of the Commerce and Labor Committee for the 128th General Assembly.

Yuko expressed interest in an appointment to the Ohio Senate after incumbent Lance Mason resigned to take a judicial position. Ultimately, the appointment went to Cleveland City Councilwoman Nina Turner.

When he was sworn into his fourth term on January 3, 2011, Yuko served as the ranking member of the Commerce and Labor Committee, as well as a member of the Health and Aging Committee, and the Veterans Affairs Committee. He was also a member of the Unemployment Compensation Advisory Council; the Permanent Joint Committee on Gaming and Wagering; and the Joint Committee on Bingo and Skill Based Gaming.

Yuko was a staunch opponent of S.B. 5 and looked to lead the cause of a referendum that would repeal the changes the bill would make upon passage. He believed the then current act trampled the rights of workers.

Yuko served the 25th senatorial district which included the cities of Beachwood, Bedford, Bedford Heights, Cleveland (partial), East Cleveland, Eastlake, Euclid, Maple Heights, Mayfield Heights, Mentor (partial), Mentor-on-the-Lake, Painesville, Pepper Pike, Richmond Heights, South Euclid, Warrensville Heights, Wickliffe, Willoughby, and Willowick; along with the villages of Fairport Harbor, Grand River, Highland Hills, Lakeline, North Randall, Orange, Timberlake, and Woodmere; as well as parts of Painesville Township.

Personal life
Yuko resides in Richmond Heights, Ohio, with his wife, Pam. They have two children: Angela and the late Kenneth ("Rocky").

References

External links
The Ohio Senate: Sen. Kenny Yuko (D-Richmond Heights) official site
The Ohio House of Representatives: Rep. Kenny Yuko (D-Richmond Heights) official site
KennyYuko.com official campaign site
Follow the Money - Kenny Yuko
2008 2006 2004 campaign contributions

1950 births
21st-century American politicians
Kent State University alumni
Living people
Democratic Party members of the Ohio House of Representatives
Democratic Party Ohio state senators
People from Cuyahoga County, Ohio
People from Euclid, Ohio
Politicians from Cleveland